Tiago Haron Martins Barroso (born August 31, 1993) is a Brazilian footballer who plays as an attacking midfielder for Flores da Cunha in the Campeonato Gaúcho Série B.

Career
Tiago Haron began his career in 2013 with Ferroviário , where he played for three seasons. Since February 2016, Tiago Haron plays for Ferroviário.

References

1993 births
Living people
Sportspeople from Fortaleza
Brazilian footballers
Association football midfielders
Ferroviário Atlético Clube (CE) players
Flores da Cunha Futebol Clube players